William Joseph Ficca (born February 15, 1950, in Delaware) is an American drummer who was a founding member of the rock groups Television and The Waitresses.

Career 
Italian origins, Ficca was a childhood friend of Tom Verlaine (aka Tom Miller). Verlaine moved to New York and in 1972 put together The Neon Boys with Richard Hell (Richard Meyers). They recruited Ficca to be their drummer and then, with the addition of second guitarist Richard Lloyd, changed their name to Television. After Television broke up Ficca joined The Waitresses. Ficca also worked with Nona Hendryx & Zero Cool, 40 Families and The Washington Squares.  He frequently performed with guitarist/vocalist Tom Verlaine and bassist Richard Hell as well as bassist Clint Bahr. He also played with the French poet and singer Sapho in 1980 on her LP called "Sapho".

He has also been featured on albums by Dave Rave, Glen or Glenda, The Novellas, Eugene Ripper, Shane Faubert, Brian Ritchie and Lach and the Secrets. He performs with Television, Gary Lucas, Dylan Nirvana and the Bad Flowers,  Gods and Monsters, the New York Blues Project, The Original Dharma Bums and Uncle Bob NYC.

References 

1950 births
Living people
American punk rock drummers
American male drummers
American new wave musicians
The Waitresses members
American rock drummers
Television (band) members
Neon Boys members
20th-century American drummers